Bharath Srinivasan (born 21 July 1983), known professionally as Bharath, is an Indian actor, who works predominantly in Tamil cinema. He has mainly acted in Tamil films, along with few films in Malayalam, Hindi and Telugu.

He made his acting debut in 2003 with S. Shankar's Boys. He then appeared in the Jayaraj-directed Malayalam vigilante film 4 the People (2004) which was a musical hit and a blockbuster in Kerala. Then, he played the negative character in Chellamae (2004).

He received his breakthrough as the lead in the Tamil film Kaadhal (2004). Some of his other notable films include Pattiyal (2006), Em Magan (2006), Veyil (2006), Pazhani (2008), Kanden Kadhalai (2009), Vaanam (2011), Ainthu Ainthu Ainthu (2013) and Kaalidas (2019).

Early and personal life
Bharath was born as Bharath Srinivasan on 21 July 1983 in Trichy, Tamil Nadu, India. He is a trained dancer by profession and joined Swingers International Dance Club when he was 11 years old. He did his schooling at DAV Senior Secondary School, he's also a football fan. Bharath has a younger sister, Preethi. His mother tongue is Tamil.

He married childhood friend Jeshly, a Malayali dentist based in Dubai, on 9 September 2013 in Chennai. He has twin boys who were born in August 2018.

Career

Debut success (2003–2009)

Bharath made his acting debut in the 2003 Tamil film Boys directed by S. Shankar, in which he played the guitarist of a boy band. He was selected for the role, after Shankar had seen him performing at a dance programme "Inspirations" at the Music Academy by Swingers. In 2004, he first appeared in the Malayalam film, the Jayaraj-directed vigilante film 4 The People, portraying one of the four protagonists. Later that year, he played the antagonist role in the Tamil film Chellamae. His portrayal of Vishwa, a possessive teenager who kidnaps his childhood friend whom he is obsessed with and although she has married someone else, was acclaimed by critics. He reprised his role from 4 The People in the Telugu remake Yuvasena. He played his first starring role in Balaji Sakthivel's Tamil romantic-drama film Kaadhal that featured him as a poor mechanic who falls in love and elopes with a wealthy twelfth-standard student. The film, produced by Shankar, received critical acclaim and commercial success. Pattiyal, a gangster thriller, was his first release in 2006. The Vishnuvardhan-directorial opened to a positive response and went to become a box office hit, with Bharath garnering accolades for his performance as a deaf and dumb hitman Later that year, he starred in Azhagai Irukkirai Bayamai Irukkirathu, Em Magan, Chennai Kadhal and Veyil. While Chennai Kadhal, a romance film by Vikraman, bombed at the box office, Thirumurugan's family drama film Em Magan was declared a hit film. He has received great accolades for Veyil.

Following Veyil, Bharath experienced a setback in his career as his subsequent releases—with the exception of Pazhani—proved to be commercially unsuccessful. He was facing an "image crisis" as he signed up for action and masala films and went on play repetitive roles as a "larger than life angry young man", playing "small town rowdy" or "guy seeking revenge" roles. Koodal Nagar, was released in 2007 in which he portrayed a dual role, which was a box office disaster. In 2008, he appeared in Perarasu's Pazhani alongside Kajal Aggarwal and Khushbu, following which Nepali, directed by V. Z. Durai was released. That year he had two more releases, Muniyandi Vilangial Moonramandu, which saw him collaborating with the Em Magan team again, and Hari's Seval. In 2009 he acted in Arumugam, directed by Suresh Krishna and Kanden Kadhalai, the Tamil remake of the 2007 Bollywood film Jab We Met. The latter featured him in a totally contrasting role as a rich businessman, and became his only commercial success in two years.

Setbacks and success (2010–2013) 

In 2010, he had a single release with Badri's Thambikku Indha Ooru which became a critical and commercial failure. In 2011, he appeared in the multi-starrer Vaanam as Bharath Chakravarthy, a guitarist. Post-release, Bharath clashed with the producer and another actor in the film, Silambarasan, claiming he did not receive as much promotion and publicity as Silambarasan's character. His next film, the romantic comedy Yuvan Yuvathi co-starring Rima Kallingal, was followed by Perarasu's action-masala film Thiruthani co-starring Sunaina. He also made a guest appearance in Vasanthabalan's Aravaan. In 2013, his romantic thriller film Ainthu Ainthu Ainthu released in August. The film, which was directed by Sasi, opened to positive reviews with a critic noting he "has put a lot of effort and hardwork to the role" and "is one single reason to watch the film". Ainthu Ainthu Ainthu is Bharath's only highest-grossing film in his career. Bharath made his Bollywood debut with Jackpot (2013). The film was about four people who try to con one another for money and Bharath played one of them, a Goan named Anthony D’Souza from Puducherry.

Career slump, struggle and resurgence (2014–present)

He returned to Malayalam cinema in 2014 with Koothara. Thereafter, he played his 25th movie in Aindhaam Thalaimurai Sidha Vaidhiya Sigamani (2014). The film was met with mixed reviews. The next was action film Killadi (2015). The film was released to negative reviews. Bharath subsequently appeared as autistic youngster in a Malayalam project titled 1000 – Oru Note Paranja Katha (2015), which garnered poor reviews on release. Later in 2015 he appeared in another Malayalam movie Lord Livingstone 7000 Kandi (2015), which was an experimental movie.

In 2017, he acted in Ennodu Vilayadu. Kadugu directed by Vijay Milton was a solid comeback, but the film was an average hit. At the end of the year, he appeared in the movie Spyder starring Mahesh Babu, a bilingual film directed by AR Murugadoss, playing a negative role in a cameo appearance. The film was a moderate success. Kadaisi Bench Karthi was released on 27 October and received negative reviews. It was a colossal flop. In 2019, Simba and Pottu commercially failed. Kaalidas, which is directed by Sri Senthil, released on 13 December 2019, featured Bharath as a cop for the first time in his career. The movie was a success for Bharath after a long time. The next is a Amazon Prime Video web series Time Enna Boss (2020). In 2021, Bharath plays as a cop in Hindi action movie Radhe with Salman Khan directed by Prabhu Deva. Bharath who tasted success with a psychological thriller Kaalidas recently returns with Naduvan. Bharath gives a measured performance in the lead role but unfortunately, his character is underwritten and one-dimensional. He later starred in two Malayalam thriller movie with Dulquer Salmaan in Kurup and then with the actors Lal and Ajmal Ameer in Kshanam.

Filmography

Films

Television

References

External links

Indian male film actors
Tamil male actors
Male actors from Tiruchirappalli
Living people
Male actors in Malayalam cinema
Male actors in Tamil cinema
Male actors in Telugu cinema
21st-century Indian male actors
Male actors from Chennai
1983 births